Pride: The LGBTQ+ History Series is a Canadian documentary television series, which premiered on OutTV in 2019. Created by Mark Kenneth Woods, the series features Woods and friends travelling to various LGBT Pride festivals around the world, to explore both the meaning and history of the event.

The first season of the series visited Calgary, New York City, Salt Lake City, Palm Springs, Hong Kong and Berlin. The second season visited San Francisco, Johannesburg, Halifax, Manchester, Miami and Auckland. The third season visited Phoenix, Dublin, Provincetown, Puerto Vallarta and Vancouver. At least one more season has already been planned.

The series has received 10 Leo Award nominations (and two wins) and three Canadian Screen Award nominations.

References

External links

2010s Canadian documentary television series
OutTV (Canadian TV channel) original programming
2019 Canadian television series debuts
2010s Canadian LGBT-related television series
2020s Canadian LGBT-related television series